The 2001 Daily Star Mosconi Cup, the eighth edition of the annual nine-ball pool competition between teams representing Europe and the United States, took place 20–23 December 2001 at the York Hall in Bethnal Green, London, England.

Team USA won the Mosconi Cup by defeating Team Europe 12–1.


Teams

 1 Born outside the United States.

Results

Thursday, 20 December

Session 1

Friday, 21 December

Session 2

Saturday, 22 December

Session 3

Sunday, 23 December

Session 4

Session 5

References

External links
 Official homepage

2001
2001 in cue sports
2001 sports events in London
Sport in the London Borough of Tower Hamlets
2001 in English sport
December 2001 sports events in the United Kingdom